The Vivo V1 is the first phone in Vivo's V Series of phones. It launched in July 2015. The phone launched at a price of ₹17,980 ($251.72).

Reception

Design 
Critics were impressed with the build quality and design of the phone. The phone is of (mostly) unibody metal design, with the top and bottom of the phone's back panel being made of plastic and white in color. The front of the phone has 3 buttons, a physical home button flanked by a menu and back button (left and right respectively), which are backlit and capacitive. The volume rocker and power/lock buttons are on the right, the micro-SD and headphone jack are found at the top of the phone. There is a notification light at the top of the front of the phone.

Screen 
The screen was described as "decent" overall. Viewing angles were decent, but not considering the display panels' technology. Screen brightness was also decent. The gesture based unlock system that allows users to draw letters on the screen to unlock the phone to a certain app (E.g. making a c on the locked phone to unlock to the call app) was also praised.

Camera 
Critics described pictures in good lighting as "decent", but that quality dropped of steeply in low-light conditions, since there was too much noise.

Audio 
One critic described the audio quality from the loudspeaker as "clear and loud."

Overall 
The consensus among all reviewers here is that the phone was decent but that the pricing of the phone is "too much" considering the features offered.

References 

Vivo smartphones
Android (operating system) devices
Mobile phones introduced in 2015
Discontinued smartphones
Mobile phones with infrared transmitter